Christopher "Chris" Allen (born 8 February 1959) is an Australian cross-country skier. He competed in the men's 15 kilometre event at the 1984 Winter Olympics.

References

External links
 

1959 births
Living people
Australian male cross-country skiers
Olympic cross-country skiers of Australia
Cross-country skiers at the 1984 Winter Olympics
Skiers from Melbourne
20th-century Australian people
Sportsmen from Victoria (Australia)
People from Frankston, Victoria